VCDS may refer to:

Vice-Chief of the Defence Staff (United Kingdom)
Vice Chief of the Defence Staff (Canada)
VAG-COM Diagnostic System, a software package used for diagnostics and adjustments of Volkswagen Group motor vehicles